Esporte Clube Campo Grande, commonly known as Campo Grande, is a Brazilian football team based in Campo Grande, Mato Grosso do Sul state.

History
The club was founded on February 14, 1993.

Stadium
Esporte Clube Campo Grande play their home games at Estádio Jacques da Luz, nicknamed Estádio das Moreninhas. The stadium has a maximum capacity of 4,500 people.

References

Association football clubs established in 1993
Football clubs in Mato Grosso do Sul
1993 establishments in Brazil